Kaashh is a 2012 Malayalam crime comedy film written and directed by debutant filmmakers Sujith and Sajith. The film is about the abduction of an industrialist's daughter by a team of four friends.

Cast
 Rajeev Pillai as Sarath
 Bineesh Kodiyeri
 Vineeth Kumar
 Innocent as Devasiya
 Mamukkoya as Manager
 Geetha Vijayan
 Lakshmi Priya
 Suraj Venjarammoodu as a trickster
 Dharmajan as the pizza boy
 Jayan as Jayasankar
 Tini Tom as Karunan
 Chembil Asokan as the moneylender
 Leenna Panchaal as Jayasankar's daughter
 Sankar R Nair as Stephen

Critical reception
The film received mixed to negative reviews upon release. Veeyen of Nowrunning.com rated the film  and said, "Not all novel ideas have a desirable impact on the viewer, as 'Kaashh' proves beyond doubt. This could have been a fun ride perhaps, but as it is, the entertainment value that the film offers is abysmally low." Paresh C. Palicha of Rediff.com rated the film  and stated, "Kaashh has some glaring gaps in the narrative" and is "an average film despite having a young team of actors who have done their best."
Review: Kaashh is just an above average fare if you want to relax 2 hours

References

External links

2010s Malayalam-language films
2012 action comedy films
Indian action comedy films
2012 directorial debut films
2012 films
2010s crime comedy films
Indian crime comedy films
2012 comedy films